Problems of a Sociology of Knowledge is a 1924 essay by the German philosopher, sociologist, and anthropologist Max Scheler. It reappeared in expanded form in Scheler's 1926 book Die Wissensformen und die Gesellschaft. It was translated into English by Manfred S. Frings and published by Routledge & Kegan Paul in 1980.

See also 
 Sociology of knowledge

References 

Sociology of knowledge
Philosophical anthropology
Contemporary philosophical literature